The Malcontenta is a 1995 Ned Kelly Award-winning novel by the Australian author Barry Maitland.

Awards

Ned Kelly Awards for Crime Writing, Best Novel, 1996: joint winner

Dedication

"Dedication: For Clare and Alex/With my very special thanks to Margaret, and to those people who have helped bring Brock and Cathy [sic] to print, in particular Kate Jones and Jill Hickson."

Notes
 This is the second novel in the author's Brock and Kolla series.
 The novel has been translated into German (Ein Hauch von Angst, 1995), French (La malcontenta, 2000) and Italian (Malcontenta, 2002).
 The title of this novel as published in the U.S. is The Malcontenta: A Kathy and Brock Mystery

Reviews
 "Australian Crime Fiction database" 
 "Italian Mysteries" 

Australian crime novels
1995 Australian novels
Ned Kelly Award-winning works
Hamish Hamilton books
Arcade Publishing books